9I or 9-I may refer to:

Alliance Air (airline IATA designator code)
9i, software release of Oracle Database

See also
I9 (disambiguation)